Operación Triunfo was the Peruvian version of the Spanish TV series of the same name and based on the international franchise Star Academy.

The inaugural and so far the only season in Peru was broadcast in 2012, on the Peruvian TV network América Televisión. The series was hosted by Gisela Valcárcel and the winner the show was then 19 year-old Mayra Goñi. As of January 2020, there is no announcement regarding a reboot.

Contestants

External links
Official website

 
2012 Peruvian television series debuts
2012 Peruvian television series endings
2010s Peruvian television series
Peruvian reality television series
América Televisión original programming